Ivar Heming Skre (22 March 1897 – 7 September 1943) was a Norwegian resistance member.

He was born in Borre to a mother from Ås and a father from Bremanger. The family moved to Avaldsnes. Here, Skre married Ingeborg Dalen from Haugesund in 1920. They relocated to Bergen.

Skre had folk high school as education. He worked as an editor in Bergen. Together with his brother Finn Åsmund Skre, born 1904, he joined the Kristian Stein group during the occupation of Norway by Nazi Germany. They published and distributed illegal newspapers. Both were arrested in October 1941. Ivar Heming Skre was imprisoned from 9 October to 7 November 1941 in Bergen, then in Ulven concentration camp until 4 May 1942. He was transferred via Kiel to Halle concentration camp, where he was executed in September 1943.

References

1897 births
1943 deaths
People from Karmøy
Norwegian resistance members
World War II resistance press activists
Ulven concentration camp prisoners
Resistance members who died in Nazi concentration camps
Norwegian civilians killed in World War II
Executed Norwegian people
People executed by Germany by firing squad
People who died in Halle concentration camp
Norwegian people executed abroad
Norwegian people executed in Nazi concentration camps